Entelechy Arts is an integrated arts company and registered charity based in London, United Kingdom.

One of its artists is Charles Hayward (musician) formerly of This Heat - he is a musician in the Entelechy project Ambient Jam.

External links
 Entelechy Arts Official website
 Cross Arts Directory British Council article

Arts in London